Hudson Taylor is an Irish folk/Americana duo formed in 2011. The band comprises brothers Harry and Alfie Hudson-Taylor. They are currently signed to Rubyworks Records.

History

Early career
The multi-instrumental siblings honed their craft busking on the streets of their hometown of Dublin as well as cities all over Europe. Their self-released debut EP Battles came out in August 2012 and peaked at #1 on the Irish iTunes chart and at #14 in the UK. Following the success of Battles, the band unveiled a second EP, Cinematic Lifestyle released in December 2012 and its subsequent release Osea, in October 2013. The duo supported Jake Bugg on his UK tours in March 2013 and again in the Autumn of 2014. They also played to one of their biggest crowds to date supporting The Rolling Stones in Hyde Park in 2013.

Singing For Strangers
Hudson Taylor's debut album Singing for Strangers (a reference to the band's earlier busking days) was released on major label Polydor in January 2015 to critical acclaim in Ireland and the UK. Singing for Strangers peaked at number 3 in Ireland and number 24 in the UK. Their first full-length offering was produced by Iain Archer, Grammy nominated singer-songwriter and producer who enjoys songwriting credits for Jake Bugg, James Bay and Niall Horan. Singing for Strangers included hugely successful singles 'Chasing Rubies' and 'Battles'. Speaking of their influences when writing the 18 track album, the band referenced Crosby, Stills & Nash and Simon & Garfunkel.

Following the group's departure from Polydor in February 2016, Hudson Taylor were signed to indie label Rubyworks Records in Ireland. They are managed by Caroline Downey, who also manages label-mate Hozier.

2018–present
At the beginning of 2018, Hudson Taylor embarked on a sold-out European tour playing to crowds in the UK, Germany, Denmark, Sweden and Netherlands. At the end of January, the band announced they would be opening for Gabrielle Aplin throughout her North American Tour. During their trip they made their US TV debut on Good Day New York on Fox and WGN-TV in Chicago. They also completed high-profile online sessions for Paste Magazine, Baeble Music and BalconyTV in LA.

In March 2018 the band released the Feel It Again EP and amassed over 1.2 million monthly listeners on Spotify. It was produced by Ryan Hadlock, best known for his work with The Lumineers and Vance Joy, and mixed by Ruadhri Cushnan (Mumford & Sons, Ed Sheeran) in Dublin. Their lead-off single 'Feel It Again' was one of the biggest Irish airplay hits of 2017. With streaming figures well in excess of 10 million listens for the Feel It Again EP and tracks ‘Run With Me’ and ‘Old Soul’ finding favour at radio and digital platforms, Hudson Taylor wrapped an action-packed Irish tour with a sold out, home town show at Olympia Theatre, Dublin, which was recorded for future release.

During summer 2018, the brothers completed a full festival circuit around Europe as well as high-profile supports with Bastille and George Ezra.

Debuted on 21 September 2018, Hudson Taylor revealed their latest offering, a mini-album entitled Bear Creek to Dame Street. Four individual singles were released in the buildup to the mini-album including 'You Don't Wanna Know' and 'One in a Million' at the end of August, followed by 'I Love You and You Don't Even Know' and 'Shot Someone'. The band described their mini-album as a collection of new songs recorded at Bear Creek Studio by Ryan Hadlock along with "some old favourites recorded from our Dublin Olympia Theatre show."

Following the release, Hudson Taylor supported Hozier during his North American tour, opening 19 sold-out shows including 3 nights at both Beacon Theatre in New York City and Wiltern Theatre in Los Angeles. 
In between shows with Hozier, Hudson Taylor also played their own sold-out headline shows in New York, Washington DC and Boston at the end of September.

In November 2018, Hudson Taylor began their second European tour of the year including a headline show in KOKO in London, finishing with a 6 night sold-out home-coming run in Whelan's in Dublin in December.

In January and February 2019, they played a U.S. headline tour accompanied by Oisin and Tadgh Walsh-Peelo in their band.

In May and June 2019, the Hudson Taylor supported Rodrigo y Gabriela on their North American tour and played a number of headline shows while in the states.

After a period of quiet, the two brothers released the single "Won't Be Too Long" on 14 January 2022.

Discography

Studio albums

Extended plays

Singles

Videography 

 "Old Soul"
 "Run with Me"
 "Feel It Again"
 "Chasing Rubies"
 "World Without You"
 "Weapons"
 "Care"
 "Battles"
 "Back to You"

References

Folk music duos
Sibling musical duos
Irish musical duos